Stretton is an electoral district of the Legislative Assembly in the Australian state of Queensland.

The district is based in the southern suburbs of Brisbane. It is named for the suburb of Stretton and also includes the suburbs of Calamvale, Eight Mile Plains, Kuraby, Sunnybank Hills and Underwood. It was first contested at the 2001 state election.

Members for Stretton

Election results

References

External links
 

Stretton